Peter Aird, Jr. (29 August 1921 – 6 December 2000) was a Scottish professional footballer, who played in the Scottish Football League for Hibernian and East Fife.

Biography
Aird was born into a coal-mining community of Glencraig, Fife. His family had come from Ayrshire to work in the mines. His father, also named Peter Aird, served as a corporal in the Gordon Highlanders during the First World War, and played for local side Glencraig Rovers with future professionals Mick Gilhooley and Bob Rowan.

In 1927, Peter Aird, Sr. was among 20 miners convicted of mobbing and rioting during a strike at the Glencraig Colliery. The miners were convicted assaulting police officers and other miners returning to work and causing significant damage to the colliery equipment and buildings. According to a local historian, Peter Aird was not involved in the violence but—as he was a member of the Communist Party of Great Britain—was singled out to serve as an example. He served nine months in jail and was blacklisted after his release, forcing the family to move to Bowhill near Cardenden.

At age 14, Peter Aird, Jr. left school to work at the Bowhill Colliery, just a few years after the Bowhill mining disaster. Inspired by his elder brother Willie Aird — a centre-forward for Greenock Morton and Queen of the South — Peter was able to escape the dangers of the mines through football. Aird first played at the junior level for the Bowhill Rovers in Cardenden.

In 1943, Hibernian manager Willie McCartney first noticed Aird and took him to Edinburgh, where he played for the club from until 1951. He then spent two years at East Fife before he wrapped up his footballing career in Wales.

Aird later worked as a manager for a textile factory in Dundee and also in the dockyard at Rosyth.

Aird died in 2000 and was survived by his wife of 53 years, Marion Gray Aird, and their five children. His ashes were scattered on the pitch at Easter Road, where he and his wife had celebrated their golden anniversary in 1997 with a special floodlit party.

References

External links

1921 births
2000 deaths
Footballers from Fife
Scottish footballers
Association football central defenders
Lochee Harp F.C. players
Hibernian F.C. players
East Fife F.C. players
Llanelli Town A.F.C. players
Scottish Football League players
Scottish Junior Football Association players
Bowhill Rovers F.C. players